Nelson Field is a multi-use stadium in Austin, Texas, located on the north side of U.S. Route 290 at the junction with Berkman Drive. It serves as home stadium for LBJ High School, Anderson High School, Eastside High School and Northeast High School. The stadium's capacity is 8,800 spectators.

Austin Aztex
High school football venues in Texas
Sports venues in Austin, Texas
Soccer venues in Texas
1965 establishments in Texas
Sports venues completed in 1965